Dr. Thomas E. Lucas House is a historic home located at Chesterfield, Chesterfield County, South Carolina.  It was built about 1868, and is a two-story, three bay, central-hall plan, frame farmhouse, with a one-story rear wing. It features a one-story porch across the front façade. Also on the property is an antebellum smokehouse, a gazebo (originally used as a hothouse, c. 1885), and several other outbuildings. The house is associated with Dr. Thomas E. Lucas, a farmer, physician and politician. In 1864 Lucas resigned his position as a lieutenant in Company A in the Fifteenth Battalion, South Carolina Artillery, to serve in the South Carolina House of Representatives.

It was listed on the National Register of Historic Places in 1982.

References

Houses on the National Register of Historic Places in South Carolina
Houses completed in 1868
Houses in Chesterfield County, South Carolina
National Register of Historic Places in Chesterfield County, South Carolina
Chesterfield, South Carolina